Electric furnace may refer to:

Heat-producing equipment
 An electric furnace
 A central heating plant for a home or building
 An electric arc furnace used for steel making and smelting of certain ores
 An industrial heat treating furnace
 An electrically heated kiln
 An induction furnace used for preparation of special alloys
 A modern muffle furnace

Other uses
 Electric Furnace (band), a Welsh heavy metal band

See also
 Furnace (house heating)